Michele Priuli (died 1603) was a Roman Catholic prelate who served as Bishop of Vicenza (1579–1603) and Apostolic Nuncio to Florence (1589–1591).

Biography
Michele Priuli was born in Venice, Italy.
On 3 Aug 1579, he was appointed during the papacy of Pope Gregory XIII as Bishop of Vicenza.
On 10 Apr 1589, he was appointed during the papacy of Pope Sixtus V as Apostolic Nuncio to Florence; he resigned from the position on 3 Aug 1591.
He served as Bishop of Vicenza until his death in 1603.

While bishop, he was the principal co-consecrator of Pietro Usimbardi, Bishop of Arezzo (1589).

References

External links and additional sources
 (for Chronology of Bishops) 
 (for Chronology of Bishops) 
 

17th-century Italian Roman Catholic bishops
16th-century Italian Roman Catholic bishops
Bishops appointed by Pope Gregory XIII
Bishops appointed by Pope Sixtus V
1603 deaths
Apostolic Nuncios to the Republic of Florence
Year of birth missing